Michael Novotny (born March 17, 1996) is an American professional soccer player who plays as a goalkeeper for Chicago House AC in the National Independent Soccer Association.

Career

College
Novotny played four years of college soccer at Eastern Illinois University between 2014 and 2017, where he made 65 appearances for the Panthers. During his time at Eastern Illinois, Novotny earned accolades such as Second Team All-Summit League in 2015 and 2016, and First Team All-Summit League and Summit League Goalkeeper of the Year in 2017.

AFC Ann Arbor
Following college, Novotny played with National Premier Soccer League side AFC Ann Arbor, where he made 8 regular season appearances, keeping 6 clean sheets to help the club to top the Great Lakes Conference. At the conclusion of the season, Novotny was named the club's Most Valuable Defensive Player for 2018.

Stöde IF
Novotny moved to Swedish third division side Stöde IF in August 2018 for the remainder of their season.

Hartford Athletic
In January 2019, Novotny joined USL Championship side Hartford Athletic ahead of their inaugural season. He didn't make an appearance for the club during 2019, but renewed his contract to return to the club for 2020. He made his debut on September 26, 2020, appearing as a 73rd-minute substitute during a 1–0 win over Pittsburgh Riverhounds following Parfait Mandanda's sending off. He got his first start with team four days later in a 3-2 win over Philadelphia Union II, saving a penalty kick in the 78th minute.

Chicago House AC
On June 4, 2021, it was announced that Novotny had signed with first-year National Independent Soccer Association team Chicago House AC, becoming the first goalkeeper signed by the club.

References

External links
Eastern Illinois University bio
Hartford Athletic bio
USL Championship bio

Living people
1996 births
AFC Ann Arbor players
American expatriate soccer players
American expatriate sportspeople in Sweden
American soccer players
Association football goalkeepers
Eastern Illinois Panthers men's soccer players
Expatriate footballers in Sweden
Hartford Athletic players
National Premier Soccer League players
People from St. Charles, Illinois
Soccer players from Illinois
USL Championship players